INS Dunagiri (F36) was a  of the Indian Navy that served for 33 years between its commissioning on 5 May 1977 and its decommissioning on 20 October 2010.

Name 
Named after the Himalayan peak, Dunagiri, the ship was a Nilgiri-class frigate that was a part of the Navy's 14th Frigate Squadron. Dunagiris crest had a Himalayan Osprey on it and her motto read Victory is My Profession.

Operational history 
Dunagiri was the fourth of the Nilgiri-class frigates to be built at the Mazgaon Docks and it took almost 58 months from the commencement of production till her final delivery to the Navy. However, Dunagiri also had a large number of indigenously produced equipment in her although much of her firepower and radars and sensors were of British or Dutch origin. Vice-admiral S Jain who later served as flag-officer-commanding-in-chief of the Western Naval Command was the Dunagiri's first commanding officer.

Operational issues 
Dunagiri underwent a medium refit in 1990 but the process took 40 months against a normal schedule of 12 months, being finally completed in February 1994. India's Comptroller and Auditor General observed that the delay in the work had not only failed to rectify the ship's main defects but had also led to corrosive damage to it on account of prolonged detention at the shipyard that necessitated a short refit in 1995 and cost overruns of 4.52 crores.

In 2006 Dunagiri was involved in a collision off the coast of Mumbai when it struck a Shipping Corporation of India merchant vessel, MV Kiti. Although there were no casualties the frigate suffered damage and required extensive repairs.

Commemoration 
On its decommissioning a philatelic cover featuring Dunagiri and a special cancellation mark featuring the ship's crest were issued by India Post.

On 15 July 2022, a new  Nilgiri class stealth frigate was launched which is its successor.

References

Nilgiri-class frigates
Frigates of the Indian Navy
1974 ships